The Archdeacon of Suffolk is a senior cleric in the Diocese of St Edmundsbury and Ipswich.

The archdeacon is responsible for the disciplinary supervision of the clergy in the territory of the archdeaconry.

History
Originally in the Dioceses of Norwich, and Rochester, the Suffolk archdeaconry was transferred to the Diocese of St Edmundsbury and Ipswich in 1914. The current archdeacon is Jeanette Gosney

List of archdeacons

High Medieval
From its erection, the archdeaconry was in Norwich diocese. For archdeacons of that diocese before territorial titles began, see Archdeacon of Norwich.
bef. 1119–aft. 1135: Roger de Beaufeu
bef. 1143–aft. 1186: Walkelin
bef. 1193–aft. 1210: Geoffrey (also called Archdeacon of Ipswich)
bef. 1214–aft. 1235: Robert de Tywa (also called Archdeacon of Ipswich)
bef. 1240–aft. 1241: Alexander de Walpole
1242–aft. 1246: Roger Pincerna alias Le Boteler
bef. 1249–aft. 1251: William de Horham
bef. 1257–aft. 1258: William de Dunton
bef. 1262–aft. 1267: John of Alvechurch
?–1282 (d.): Thomas Lenebaud
bef. 1291–1296 (res.): Thomas de Skerning (became Archdeacon of Surrey)
bef. 1298–bef. 1311: Sayerus (or Sacrus or Saer)

Late Medieval
10 January 1311–bef. 1324 (res.): Simon de Ely
28 March–April 1324 (res.): Alan de Ely
16 April 1224–bef. 1231 (res.): William de Knapton
31 March 1331–bef. 1347 (d.): John de Fenton
3–27 May 1347 (deprived): Richard Lyng (deprived)
27 May 1347–June 1353 (exch.): Michael Northburgh (later Bishop of London)
June 1353–bef. 1357 (d.): William de Fieschi or de Flisco
1357 (d.): Francis de St Maximo
1357–bef. 1359 (res.): Hélie Cardinal de Talleyrand-Périgord (Cardinal Bishop of Albano)
5 June 1359–bef. 1363: John de Carleton (displaced)
bef. 1363–21 July 1365 (exch.): William Graa de Trusthope
21 July 1365–bef. 1367 (d.): Carleton (again)
16 January 1367 – 20 January 1368 (deprived): John de Ufford (deprived)
20 January 1368–bef. 1373 (d.): John Aleyn
10 December 1373 – 1381 (deprived): John Clervaus
bef. 1374–?: Guillaume Cardinal Noellet (Cardinal-deacon of Sant'Angelo in Pescheria)
?–25 August 1380 (d.): Eleazario Cardinal de Sabrano (Cardinal-priest of Santa Balbina)
4 August 1380 – 1381: Philippe Cardinal Valois d'Alençon (Cardinal Bishop of Sabina)
bef. 1382–bef. 1383 (d.): John Clervaus (regained possession)
2 September–October/November 1383 (deprived): William de Malebys
1 April 1384–bef. 1387: Thomas de Shirford
28 May–8 July 1387 (exch.): Henry Sturdy
8 July 1387 – 1 July 1390 (exch.): Robert Foulmere
1 July 1390–bef. 1421 (d.): John Thorpe
10 November 1421–bef. 1441 (d.): John Franks
?–1448 (res.): Richard Beauchamp (became Bishop of Hereford)
14 March 1449–bef. 1472 (d.): Henry Trevilian
2 March 1472–April 1497 (d.): William Pykenham
20 April 1487 – 1505 (d.): Nicholas Goldwell
?–bef. 1526 (res.): John Dolman

12 November 1526 – 1528: Thomas Wynter (also Dean of Wells, Archdeacon of York and Archdeacon of Richmond; became Archdeacon of Norfolk)
1524-1526, 1528-1529 (res.): Edmund Steward
11 January 1529 – 1536 (res.): Richard Sampson (became Bishop of Chichester)
1 November 1536 – 1539 (res.): John Skypp (became Bishop of Hereford)
27 August 1540–bef. 1542: William Ryvell

Early modern
8 February 1542–bef. 1548 (d.): Elizeus Ferreys
20 August 1548–bef. 1559 (d.): Robert Rugge
17 April 1559 – 1576 (deprived): Nicholas Wendon (fled overseas and deprived)
10 November 1576 – 1613 (d.): John Maplesden
6 October 1613–bef. 1640 (d.): Robert Pearson
1 February–November 1640 (d.): Robert Bostock
27 November 1640–bef. 1660 (deprived): Richard Mileson (deprived)
18 September 1660 – 1683 (res.): Laurence Womack (became Bishop of St David's)
3 January 1684–bef. 1687 (d.): Godfrey King
1 October 1687–bef. 1688 (res.): John Battely (became Archdeacon of Canterbury)
20 December 1688 – 1 November 1724 (d.): Humphrey Prideaux (also Dean of Norwich from 1702)
19 December 1724 – 6 September 1745 (d.): David Wilkins
19 September 1745 – 5 January 1748 (d.): Richard Warren
19 February 1748 – 23 February 1781 (d.): Henry Goodall
5 March 1781 – 17 December 1818 (d.): John Strachey
27 February 1819–bef. 1846 (res.): Henry Berners
12 January 1846–bef. 1868 (res.): Thomas Ormerod

Late modern
May 1868–March 1869 (res.): Vincent Ryan, assistant bishop (later Archdeacon of Craven)
March 1869–1887 (res.): Robert Groome, Rector of Monk Soham
1887–22 April 1892 (d.): Joseph Woolley, Rector of East Bergholt
May 1892–1901 (res.): Richard Gibson, Rector of Lound
1901–1917 (ret.): Charles Lawrence
February 1917–14 September 1919 (d.): William Everingham
1919–24 July 1938 (d.): James Darling, Rector of Eyke &c.
1938–1947 (ret.): Thomas Wonnacott, Rector of Stonham Aspal (afterwards archdeacon emeritus)
1947–September 1961 (ret.): Christopher George, Rector of Sproughton (afterwards archdeacon emeritus)
1962–1970 (ret.): Claud Scott, Vicar of Hoxne &c. (afterwards archdeacon emeritus)
1970–1975 (res.): Peter Hartley, Rector of Badingham &c. (afterwards archdeacon emeritus)
1975–1984 (res.): Donald Smith, Rector of Redgrave cum Botesdale &c. (until 1979; became Archdeacon of Sudbury)
1984–1987 (res.): Terry Gibson (became Archdeacon of Ipswich)
1987–30 March 1994 (ret.): Neil Robinson
1994–2009 (ret.): Geoffrey Arrand (afterwards archdeacon emeritus)
2009–2012 (res.): Judy Hunt
6 September 20123 October 2019 (d.): Ian Morgan
18 January 2020present: Jeanette Gosney (previously Acting since May 2019)

References

Sources

 
Lists of Anglicans
Lists of English people
Religion in Suffolk
Diocese of St Edmundsbury and Ipswich